George Gubbins (born December 8, 1935, in Hamilton, Ontario) is a Canadian retired jockey.  He began his professional riding career in 1953 in Toronto where he competed at Greenwood Raceway and Woodbine Racetrack until 1974, with several years missed due to accidents. In addition he competed at Fort Erie Racetrack and at Blue Bonnets Raceway in Montreal where he won a riding title in 1961. Gubbins also raced at Waterford Park in Chester, West Virginia and various other tracks in the United States.

After his retirement as a jockey, George Gubbins became a clocker in southern California.  He now resides in Spartanburg, South Carolina.

References
 Montreal Gazette - August 24, 1961 article on George Gubbins
 Pittsburgh Post-Gazette - October 14, 1961 article on George Gubbins
 

1935 births
Living people
Canadian jockeys
Sportspeople from Hamilton, Ontario